Attila Baumgartner (born 13 June 1977 in Körmend) is a Hungarian football (midfielder) player who currently plays for Gyirmót SE.

References
eufo
Player profile at HLSZ

1977 births
Living people
People from Körmend
Hungarian people of German descent
Hungarian footballers
Association football midfielders
Szombathelyi Haladás footballers
Győri ETO FC players
FC Sopron players
Pécsi MFC players
Integrál-DAC footballers
Gyirmót FC Győr players
Sportspeople from Vas County